Kim Han-gil (born July 26, 1988) better known by his stage name Zick Jasper, formerly 5Zic, is a South Korean rapper and beatboxer. He was a former member of the hip-hop group M.I.B, where he served as a rapper and the leader of the group. He made his recording debut with the single "Beautiful Day" just before his debut with the group. He is currently signed under Jungle Entertainment.

Biography

1988–2016: Early life and career beginnings
Zick Jasper was born on July 26, 1988, in Ilsan, South Korea. He debuted as a member of M.I.B, under the label Jungle Entertainment on October 25, 2011, with the title track "G.D.M" aka "Girls, Dreams, Money." His single track "Beautiful Day" released on October 7, 2011, as a part of a spin-off promotion to prove that each member is capable of standing alone. He has already served his mandatory military enlistment, having entered the military at the age of 20, and serving for two years (July 2007 - July 2, 2009).

He was recently featured in Lyn's new song, "Blood Type AB Woman".

Zick Jasper had been seen on Show Me the Money 5 with Group member SIMS and was said to be both judged by Gray but were eliminated during preliminary round.

Discography

Album

Digital singles

Filmography

Television series

References

External links
 

1988 births
21st-century South Korean male  singers
Jungle Entertainment artists
K-pop singers
Living people
South Korean male idols
People from Goyang
South Korean male rappers